Devalingikoppa is a village in Dharwad district of Karnataka, India.

Demographics
As of the 2011 Census of India there were 367 households in Devalingikoppa and a total population of 1,864 consisting of 957 males and 907 females. There were 254 children ages 0-6.

References

Villages in Dharwad district